Nevado del Huila at , is the highest volcano in Colombia, located at the tripoint of the departments of Huila, Tolima and Cauca. It is visible from the city of Cali. The andesitic volcano is located on top of the Ibagué Batholith.

After being dormant for more than 500 years, the volcano showed heavy signs of activity in 2007 and 2008. As of February 20, 2007, there were more than 7000 "minor" seismic events, and a high state of alert was in place for the departments of Cauca, Huila, Caldas and Valle del Cauca. The volcano erupted twice in April 2007, once in April 2008 and again in November 2008. Any eruption would affect the small villages around the volcano, mostly Páez, where their inhabitants still have in memory the eruption of the Nevado del Ruiz volcano and the destruction of Armero.

Eruptions

2007 eruption 
On April 18, 2007, the volcano erupted twice causing avalanches into the Paez River; this event caused water levels to rise along the Magdalena River. More than 4,000 people were evacuated with no casualties reported.

2008 activity and eruption 
Nevado del Huila became active again in March 2008. After a multitude of earthquakes inside the volcano, Colombian authorities declared a state of yellow alert on March 18. The state of alert was increased to orange on March 29, meaning an eruption could be expected within two weeks. Hundreds of people were evacuated. On April 14, 2008 at 11:08 pm, an ash eruption took place, prompting the government to issue a red alert and evacuate 13,000 to 15,000 people from around the mountain. The state of red alert was again lowered to orange on April 16, following diminished activity.

November 2008 eruption 
On November 20, 2008, the volcano erupted at 02:45 GMT (at 21:45 on November 20 local time) according to Colombian Institute of Geology and Mining. An immediate mass-scale evacuation was put in motion by the Colombian authorities, which the inhabitants of some towns reportedly refused. There were no injured reported at the time. On November 23, 2008, BBC News, citing Colombian authorities, announced that the eruption had claimed ten lives, with 12,000 nearby residents being evacuated and emergency services unable to reach many of the more remote affected locations. The eruption had triggered an avalanche of earth and debris that damaged houses, bridges and crops on plantations. The three small towns of Paicol, La Plata and Belalcázar along the Páez River were affected by this eruption.

Extensive instrumentation of the volcano, put in place by the existing national system for prevention and care of disasters, which includes training of local inhabitants in high-risk regions and deployment of alarms in nearby towns, reportedly prevented large-scale deaths. President Álvaro Uribe ordered the Air Force of Colombia to create an "air bridge" to provide supplies for cut off towns along the Páez River.

See also 
 List of volcanoes in Colombia
 List of volcanoes by elevation

References

Bibliography

External links 

 Global Volcanism Program
 Nevado del Huila Volcano Observatory

Páramos
Stratovolcanoes of Colombia
Geography of Cauca Department
Geography of Huila Department
Geography of Tolima Department
Active volcanoes
Andean Volcanic Belt
Mountains of Colombia
Glaciers of Colombia
Biosphere reserves of Colombia
21st-century volcanic events
Natural disasters in Colombia
2007 in Colombia
2008 in Colombia
2007 natural disasters
2008 natural disasters
Holocene stratovolcanoes
Quaternary South America
Five-thousanders of the Andes